Nemapogon defectella is a moth of the family Tineidae. It is found in North America, where it has been recorded from Arizona, California, New Hampshire and West Virginia.

References

Moths described in 1873
Nemapogoninae